Colasposoma dauricum is a species of leaf beetle from eastern Asia. It was first described by Carl Gustaf Mannerheim in 1849. It is known as a pest of sweet potatoes.

C. dauricum and the similar species Colasposoma viridicoeruleum (formerly known as Colasposoma auripenne) are sometimes considered to be a single species, with C. dauricum dauricum as the northern subspecies, and C. dauricum auripenne as the southern subspecies.

Distribution
The species is known from Russia (Siberia and Far East), Kazakhstan, Mongolia, China (North and Northeast), Taiwan, North Korea, South Korea and Japan. In 2016, it was also recorded in Piedmont, Italy as an invasive species.

References

dauricum
Beetles of Asia
Insects of Russia
Insects of Central Asia
Insects of Mongolia
Insects of China
Insects of Taiwan
Insects of Korea
Insects of Japan
Taxa named by Carl Gustaf Mannerheim (naturalist)
Agricultural pest insects
Beetles described in 1849